Maurice Cam (1901–1974) was a French film director. He directed fourteen films between 1939 and 1967 as well as working as assistant director and other various jobs in the film industry.

Cam was originally an illustrator, who worked on film posters. Cam made his directoral debut with the 1939 thriller Metropolitan, set partly on the Paris Métro. The film was a hit, and was remade the following year in Britain as A Window in London.

Selected filmography
 Metropolitan (1939)
 La Taverna della libertà (1950)
 Blonde (1950)

References

Bibliography 
 Hodgson, Michael. Patricia Roc. Author House, 2013. 
 Rège, Philippe. Encyclopedia of French Film Directors, Volume 1. Scarecrow Press, 2009.

External links 
 

1901 births
1974 deaths
French film directors
Mass media people from Marseille
French people of Italian descent